Pentecostal church in Kermanshah is an Assyrian Pentecostal Church in Kermanshah city of Iran.

References 

Assyrian Pentecostal Church
Cathedrals in Iran
Assyrians in Iran